Iskandar is an urban-type settlement in Tashkent Region, Uzbekistan. It is part of Boʻstonliq District. In 1989 the town's population was 26,161 people.

References

Populated places in Tashkent Region
Urban-type settlements in Uzbekistan